Thomas Twisden or Twysden may refer to:

Sir Thomas Twisden, 1st Baronet, (1602–1683), English lawyer, judge and politician
Sir Thomas Twisden, 3rd Baronet (1668–1728), British politician and lawyer

See also
Twysden baronets for several other Thomas Twysdens
Thomas Twisden Hodges, MP for Rochester